Fred Maltby Warner (July 21, 1865 – April 17, 1923) was an American politician. He served as the 26th governor of Michigan from 1905 to 1911.

Birth in England and early life in Michigan
Born in Hickling, Nottinghamshire, England, Warner spent most of his life in Michigan. Warner was orphaned at three months of age and adopted by a family in Farmington. His adoptive father, P. Dean Warner, served in both chambers of the state legislature during periods from 1852 to 1870.

He attended the common schools there and later attended the Michigan Agricultural College (now Michigan State University). He worked at his father's store and later, as a Farmington businessman and agriculturist, he established thirteen cheese factories.

Politics
As a prominent citizen he rose quickly in politics in 1894. From 1895 to 1898 he served in the Michigan Senate just as his father did. From 1901 until 1904 he served as the Michigan Secretary of State under Aaron T. Bliss.

In 1904, Warner was elected Governor of Michigan and served three terms, 1905–1911. He was known as a progressive governor advocating such policies as regulation of railroad and insurance, conservation, child labor laws and woman's suffrage. Also during his six years in office, a factory inspection bill was authorized, a direct primary election law was sanctioned and there was a promotion of highway construction.

Retirement and death
After leaving office, he stayed politically active. Warner was a member of the Freemasons, Shriners, Elks, Knights of Pythias, and Maccabees. In 1920, he began serving as a Republican National Committeeman until his death three years later. He died at the age of 57 from kidney failure and is interred at Oakwood Cemetery in Farmington, Michigan.

See also
List of U.S. state governors born outside the United States

References

The Political Graveyard
National Governors Association
Detroit News, April 17, 1923. "Fred M. Warner Dead in Florida: Three-Time Governor of State Loses Long Fight for Health in South."
 https://web.archive.org/web/20150110005136/http://ci.farmington.mi.us/Community/WarnerMansion/OverviewWarner.asp

Further reading
Fuller, George, Ed., Messages of the Governors of Michigan, Volume 4 (East Lansing, Michigan: Michigan State University Press) ; .

External links

1865 births
1923 deaths
American adoptees
American Freemasons
Methodists from Michigan
British emigrants to the United States
Burials in Michigan
Michigan State University alumni
Republican Party governors of Michigan
Republican Party Michigan state senators
People from Farmington, Michigan
People from Rushcliffe (district)
Secretaries of State of Michigan
19th-century American politicians
20th-century American politicians